Kenneth Cope (born June 12, 1961) is an American composer and performer of religious music geared towards Latter-day Saints. His first album, Heaven — Don't Miss It For The World, was released in 1988. His twelfth album, All About You, was released in March 2008. His album, Son of Man, was released in 2018.

Cope lived in Houston, Texas, during his high school years and attended the High School for the Performing and Visual Arts.  He has been closely associated with the music of Especially for Youth (EFY), with seven EFY albums having songs he composed. He also has served as an LDS missionary in Switzerland and France from 1980 to 1982. He currently resides in Salt Lake City, Utah and has served as an LDS Bishop.

He and his wife have three children.

References

External links
Official website
KennethCopeOnline.com
Kenneth Cope at LDSAudio.com

1961 births
Living people
American male composers
21st-century American composers
American Mormon missionaries in France
American Mormon missionaries in Switzerland
American male singers
20th-century Mormon missionaries
American leaders of the Church of Jesus Christ of Latter-day Saints
Latter Day Saints from Texas
Latter Day Saints from Utah
21st-century American male musicians